Knight Force is a video game developed by Titus France for the Amstrad CPC, Atari ST, Amiga, IBM PC compatibles, and the ZX Spectrum. It was published in 1989.

Plot
The player is a champion who must travel to five different time zones in order to battle an evil magician who has captured a princess. The player must fight a variety of enemies in order to retrieve the correct amulet for each time zone. The player must also kill a number of clones of the magician in order to slay the real conjurer and rescue the princess.

Reception
The game was reviewed in 1990 in Dragon #157 by Hartley, Patricia, and Kirk Lesser in "The Role of Computers" column. The reviewers gave the game 1 out of 5 stars.

Reviews
The Games Machine - Dec, 1989
Zero - Dec, 1989
Your Sinclair - May, 1990
ST Action - Jan, 1990
ASM (Aktueller Software Markt) - Jan, 1990
ASM (Aktueller Software Markt) - Dec, 1989

References

External links
Knight Force at GameSpot
Knight Force at GameFAQs

1989 video games
Amiga games
Amstrad CPC games
Atari ST games
DOS games
Titus Software games
Video games developed in France
ZX Spectrum games